The Earth Gravitational Models (EGM) are a series of geopotential models of the Earth published by the National Geospatial-Intelligence Agency (NGA). They are used as the geoid reference in the World Geodetic System.

The NGA provides the models in two formats: as the series of numerical coefficients to the spherical harmonics which define the model, or a dataset giving the geoid height at each coordinate at a given resolution.

Three model versions have been published: EGM84 with n=m=180, EGM96 with n=m=360, and EGM2008 with n=m=2160. n and m are the degree and orders of harmonic coefficients; the higher they are, the more parameters the models have, and the more precise they are. EGM2008 also contains expansions to n=2190. Developmental versions of the EGM are referred to as Preliminary Gravitational Models (PGMs).

Each version of EGM has its own EPSG code as a vertical datum.

History

EGM84 
The first EGM, EGM84, was defined as a part of WGS84. WGS84 combines the old GRS 80 with the then-latest data, namely available Doppler, satellite laser ranging and Very Long Baseline Interferometry (VLBI) observations, and a new least squares method called collocation. It allowed for a model with n=m=180 to be defined, providing a raster for every half degree (30', 30 minute) of latitude and longitude of the world. NIMA also computed and made available 30′×30′ mean altimeter derived gravity anomalies from the GEOSAT Geodetic Mission. 15′×15′ is also available.

EGM96 
EGM96 from 1996 is the result of a collaboration between the National Imagery and Mapping Agency (NIMA), the NASA Goddard Space Flight Center (GSFC), and the Ohio State University. It took advantage of new surface gravity data from many different regions of the globe, including data newly released from the NIMA archives. Major terrestrial gravity acquisitions by NIMA since 1990 include airborne gravity surveys over Greenland and parts of the Arctic and the Antarctic, surveyed by the Naval Research Lab (NRL) and cooperative gravity collection projects, several of which were undertaken with the University of Leeds. These collection efforts have improved the data holdings over many of the world's land areas, including Africa, Canada, parts of South America and Africa, Southeast Asia, Eastern Europe, and the former Soviet Union. In addition, there have been major efforts to improve NIMA's existing 30' mean anomaly database through contributions over various countries in Asia. EGM96 also included altimeter derived anomalies derived from ERS-1 by Kort & Matrikelstyrelsen (KMS), (National Survey and Cadastre, Denmark) over portions of the Arctic, and the Antarctic, as well as the altimeter derived anomalies of Schoene [1996] over the Weddell Sea. The raster from EGM96 is provided at 15'x15' resolution.

EGM96 is a composite solution, consisting of:
 a combination solution to degree and order 70,
 a block diagonal solution from degree 71 to 359,
 and the quadrature solution at degree 360.

PGM2000A is an EGM96 derivative model that incorporates normal equations for the dynamic ocean topography implied by the POCM4B ocean general circulation model.

EGM2008 
The official Earth Gravitational Model EGM2008 has been publicly released by the National Geospatial-Intelligence Agency (NGA) EGM Development Team. Among other new data sources, the GRACE satellite mission provided a very high resolution model of the global gravity. This gravitational model is complete to spherical harmonic degree and order 2159 (block diagonal), and contains additional coefficients extending to degree 2190 and order 2159. It provides a raster of 2.5′×2.5′  and an accuracy approaching 10 cm. 1'×1' is also available in non-float but lossless PGM, but original .gsb files are better. Indeed, some libraries like GeographicLib use uncompressed PGM, but it is not original float data as was present in .gsb format. That introduces an error of up to 0.3 mm because of 16 bit quantisation, using lossless float GeoTIFF or original .gsb files is a good idea. The two grids can be recreated by using program in Fortran and source data from NGA. "Test versions" of EGM2008 includes PGM2004, 2006, and 2007.

As with all spherical harmonic models, EGM2008 can be truncated to have fewer coefficients with lower resolution.

EGM2020 
EGM2020 is to be a new release (still not released as of February 2022) with the same structure as EGM2008, but with improved accuracy by incorporating newer data. It was originally planned to be released in April 2020. The precursor version XGM2016 (X stands for experimental) was released in 2016 up to degree and order (d/o) 719. XGM2019e was released in 2020 up to spheroidal d/o 5399 (that corresponds to a spatial resolution of 2′ which is ~4 km) and spherical d/o 5540 with a different spheroidal harmonic construction followed by conversion back into spherical harmonics. XGM2020 was also released recently.

See also 
 Geoid
 ETRS89
 NAD83
 WGS84

References

External links 
 EGM96: The NASA GSFC and NIMA Joint Geopotential Model
 Earth Gravitational Model 2008 (EGM2008)
 GeographicLib provides a utility GeoidEval (with source code) to evaluate the geoid height for the EGM84, EGM96, and EGM2008 Earth gravity models.  Here is an online version of GeoidEval.
 The Tracker Component Library from the United States Naval Research Laboratory is a free Matlab library with a number of gravitational synthesis routines. The function getEGMGeoidHeight can be used to evaluate the geoid height under the EGM96 and EGM2008 models. Additionally, the gravitational potential, acceleration, and gravity gradient (second spatial derivatives of the potential) can be evaluated using the spherHarmonicEval function, as demonstrated in DemoGravCode.

Geodesy